Rush! is the third studio album by Italian rock band Måneskin, released on 20 January 2023 through Epic Records. It was preceded by the singles "Mammamia", "Supermodel", "The Loneliest" and "Gossip". In support of the album and its predecessor Teatro d'ira: Vol. I (2021), the band embarked on the Loud Kids Tour Gets Louder between late 2022 and mid-2023.

Background and recording
Måneskin recorded "probably 50" songs for the album, which they recorded in part in Los Angeles with producer Max Martin. The band revealed that they had been working on their "debut international album" with Martin and the MXM and Wolf Cousins team, including Savan Kotecha and Mattman & Robin, extensively after meeting them the previous year. The band's single "Supermodel", which was worked on with Martin and Rami Yacoub, was premiered live during the final of the Eurovision Song Contest 2022. The band later teased a song on the album called "Gasoline", written in support of Ukraine after the 2022 Russian invasion, also made by the team. They were also influenced during the writing and recording process after listening to Radiohead, with bassist Victoria De Angelis stating that Måneskin had "tried to experiment a bit more with [their] sound. We listened to a lot of Radiohead where they work a lot with pedals." Frontman Damiano David said: "I think that the inspiration we got from Radiohead was to be very focused on creating a very specific world for each song. It's something they do very, very well so we tried to create these amazing atmospheres. They really create an image of what you're listening to, and that gave us inspiration."

The band announced the album on 31 October 2022, and later shared its track listing on 15 December. The album is composed of fourteen tracks in English and three in Italian, including the band's concert staple and "fan favourite" track "Gasoline", as well as another song they debuted in concert, "Kool Kids". In an interview with Entertainment Weekly, David explained the inclusion of the Italian tracks: "Because we feel like the Italian music part is such a strong part of us and our culture and our background. We didn't want the Italian music to be here and there every once in a while in the tracklist. We wanted to create a block that represents the foundation everything is built around."

Singles
"Mammamia" was released as the album's lead single on 8 October 2021. The second and third singles, "Supermodel" and "The Loneliest", followed in May and October 2022, respectively. The fourth single, "Gossip", was released on 13 January 2023. A promotional single titled "La fine" was released on 16 December 2022.

Reception

At review aggregator Metacritic, which assigns a weighted rating out of 100 to reviews from mainstream critics, Rush! has an average score of 65 based on 16 reviews, indicating "generally favorable" reception. Aggregator AnyDecentMusic? gave it 6.6 out of 10, based on their assessment of the critical consensus. Rho Chung of The Skinny opined that the album "perfectly captures the sense of spontaneous authenticity that makes for a one-of-a-kind show". Writing for Kerrang!, Sam Law felt that the band are "still utterly unstoppable" when they "tap into the youthful exuberance and fiery eccentricity that got them here in the first place". Robin Murray of Clash deemed the album "exhaustive and exhausting" and "the definitive word in this unlikely rock phenomenon – at its best, it's a feral reminder of how entertaining the genre can be".

Rolling Stones David Browne found that "the ridiculousness of most of Rush!" is a demonstration of how Måneskin "only manage to confirm how hard rock & roll has to work these days to be noticed". Calling the project the "broadest stroke" of the band, Browne appreciated Max Martin's production, who "knows his way around a hook", and the revival of the "deadpan, half-spoken new-wave novelty". Alexis Petridis, reviewing the album for The Guardian, wrote that Måneskin capture their influences and make them "genuinely coherent" on the project, with an "oddly guileless" result. Petridis noted that what the project lacks is made up for with "enthusiasm" and "If that enthusiasm occasionally tips over into a cloying eagerness to please, more often it's infectious". Annabel Nugent of The Independent found that over the course of the album it is difficult to get a moment "where you don't have some fun", finding that nevertheless on first listen it sounds "amorphous".

Lauren Murphy of The Irish Times wrote that "as a collection of surface-level, toe-tappy rock songs", the album is "more than serviceable", calling it a "a bid to secure Måneskin's foothold in foreign territories" with "slick English-language affairs", although "lyrically uninventive". Murphy noted that on the album the band seems aware "that we'd never have heard of them if not for the profile afforded them by Eurovision". Reviewing the album for The Atlantic, Spencer Kornhaber was not impressed with Rush! compared to the band's previous efforts, writing that it "does not make a very strong case that the band's appeal is its music". Kornhaber pointed out that "the album's redundancy has the odd effect of calling into question the guitars are back! narrative that the band seemingly invites", labelling the songs "plainly recycled" and "brazenly mediocre". Jeremy D. Larson of Pitchfork dismissed the album, calling it "absolutely terrible at every conceivable level: vocally grating, lyrically unimaginative, and musically one-dimensional. It is a rock album that sounds worse the louder you play it."

Sarah Taylor of Gigwise judged the band to be "playing it safe with the lyrics on this record, exaggerating up their rebel aesthetic, and compromising the lyrical beauty of earlier tracks like 'Torna a casa' and 'Coraline'", suggesting that "some of their songs are all style and no substance". Taylor noted that the three tracks sung in Italian are some of "the most frenetic and thrilling" on the record. Conversely, Italian music critics noted that the Italian-language tracks are the least musically and lyrically functional.

Claudio Cabona of Rockol described the project as a "pop-rock playlist that tends to repeat itself", pointing out "the band's tendency to make its own the styles, clichés, and sounds of a rock that has already been heard". He felt that the band's young audience will welcome the record as it "has no definite footholds and references [...] because they haven't experienced it". Claudio Todesco of Rolling Stone Italia noted that the futility of trying to analyse the album, as "you end up criticizing the substantial lack of an original musical language, the lack of charm, the absence of high-level creativity", finding that even if the band "didn't do anything new, they did it at the right time" because "they understand rock as a living body, not an excellent corpse to be watched over".

Track listing

Notes
  signifies a primary and vocal producer
  signifies a co-producer
  signifies an assistant producer

Personnel
Måneskin
 Damiano David – lead vocals (all tracks), background vocals (track 7)
 Victoria De Angelis – bass guitar, background vocals
 Thomas Raggi – guitar
 Ethan Torchio – drums

Additional musicians
 Tom Morello – guitar (track 2)
 Rami Yacoub – arrangement, programming (3, 5, 6, 8, 10, 11); background vocals (3, 6, 8)
 Sly – arrangement, programming (3, 5, 6, 8, 10, 11); background vocals (3, 6, 8)
 Justin Tranter – background vocals (6, 8, 11)
 Mattman & Robin – background vocals, programming (7)
 Savan Kotecha – background vocals (7)
 Max Martin – background vocals (8)

Technical
 Enrico La Falce – mastering, mixing (1, 2, 4, 9, 12–14, 17); engineering (4, 9, 14)
 Randy Merrill – mastering (3, 5–8, 10, 11, 16)
 Mark "Spike" Stent – mixing (3, 5–7, 16)
 Serban Ghenea – mixing (8, 11)
 John Hanes – mixing (8), engineering (11)
 Michael Ilbert – mixing (10)
 Luca Pellegrini – engineering (1, 2, 4, 9, 12–14, 16, 17), vocal engineering (1, 2, 4, 14)
 Fabrizio Ferraguzzo – engineering (1, 4, 12–14), vocal engineering (2)
 Rami Yacoub – engineering (3, 5, 8, 10, 11)
 Sly – engineering (3, 5, 8, 10, 11)
 Jeremy Lertola – engineering (5, 10, 16)
 Sam Holland – engineering (5, 10, 16)
 Enrico Brun – engineering (12, 13)
 Marco Vialardi – editing (1, 2, 4, 9, 13, 14), engineering assistance (1, 2, 4, 9, 12, 13, 14, 17)
 Michael Gario – editing (2, 12)
 Matt Wolach – engineering assistance (3, 5–7)
 Gabriele Barban – engineering assistance (12, 13)
 Mattia Bonvini – engineering assistance (12, 13)
 Raffaele Stefani – engineering assistance (12, 13)

Visuals
 Aurora Manni – creative direction
 Tommaso Ottomano – art direction, photography
 Alice Zani – graphic design
 Daniela Boccadoro – graphic coordination

Charts

Certifications

References

2023 albums
Albums produced by Mattman & Robin
Albums produced by Max Martin
Albums produced by Rami Yacoub
Epic Records albums
Italian-language albums
Måneskin albums